Temperley is a city in the province of Buenos Aires, Argentina, that forms part of the Greater Buenos Aires metro area.

Temperley may also refer to:

Club Atlético Temperley, an Argentine sports club in Temperley
Temperley–Lieb algebra, an algebra from which are built certain transfer matrices, invented by Neville Temperley and Elliott Lieb
The House of Temperley, a 1913 British silent drama film directed by Harold M. Shaw

People with the surname
Alan Temperley, British author
Alice Temperley (born 1975), British fashion designer 
Edward Temperley Gourley (1826–1902), English coal fitter, shipowner and politician
George Temperley (1823-1900), British-Argentine landowner, founder of Temperley, Argentina
Georgina Temperley (1880–1936), Australian recruiting officer in WWI
Harold Temperley (1879–1939), British historian
Harold Neville Vazeille Temperley (1915–2017), British applied mathematician and physicist 
Joe Temperley (1929–2016), Scottish jazz saxophonist
Kavyen Temperley (born 1978), Australian musician
Nicholas Temperley, American musicologist

See also
Timperley, a suburban village in Altrincham, Trafford, Greater Manchester, England